El Copé is a corregimiento (subdistrict) in Olá District, Coclé Province, Panama. Its population as of 1990 was 1,081; its population as of 2000 was 1,263.

See also
El Copé National Park

References

Corregimientos of Coclé Province